Gupis Tehsil is an administrative division (a tehsil) of Gupis-Yasin District, in Gilgit-Baltistan, a northern region of Pakistan. Gupis lies in the southern part of the Gupis-Yasin District.  There are many villages and lush green and very pleasant places and resort and historical places like Yangal, Sumal, Hakis, Jindrote, Dahimal, Pingal and Khasunder.

Phander 
This area Of Gupis-Yasin District is located in Shandure pass which joins the Chitral and  Gilgit baltistan. It also can be a path to join Tajikistan and Pakistan.

Phander Valley is well known for trout fish found in abundance. Phander includes Shamaran, Chachi, Dalimal, Gulagmuli, and Teru villages.

This area has a lake which abounds in trout.  It is about 170 km from Gilgit city and the time required to get there is about 5 hours.

Shandur pass 
This is a 12,500 feet high pass which connects Gilgit to Chitral.  The pass remains snow-bound during winters.  It is 250 km and 15 hours away by jeep.

Administration 

The Gupis tehsil is administratively divided into many Union Councils.

References 

Gupis-Yasin District
Tehsils of Gilgit-Baltistan